Seth Heikkilä (14 August 1863 – 27 July 1938) was a Finnish journalist, writer and politician, born in Multia. He was a Member of the Parliament of Finland from 1907 to 1909, from 1910 to 1911 and again from 1917 to 1918, representing the Social Democratic Party of Finland (SDP). In 1918, he was imprisoned for having sided with the Reds during the Finnish Civil War.

References

1863 births
1938 deaths
People from Multia
People from Vaasa Province (Grand Duchy of Finland)
Social Democratic Party of Finland politicians
Members of the Parliament of Finland (1907–08)
Members of the Parliament of Finland (1908–09)
Members of the Parliament of Finland (1910–11)
Members of the Parliament of Finland (1917–19)
People of the Finnish Civil War (Red side)
Prisoners and detainees of Finland
Finnish journalists
Finnish writers
Writers from Central Finland